House of Whipcord is a 1974 British exploitation horror film directed and produced by Pete Walker and starring Barbara Markham, Patrick Barr, Ray Brooks, Ann Michelle, Sheila Keith, Dorothy Gordon, Robert Tayman and Penny Irving.

Plot
The film opens during a night-time thunderstorm when a frightened, confused and disheveled young woman runs down a country road and is picked up by a trucker (Ivor Salter). The film then shows through flashbacks how the young woman came to be in such a situation.

While at a gathering in a London art gallery, naive French model Anne-Marie DeVernet (Penny Irving) is shocked to see that her photographer boyfriend is exhibiting a recently-shot photo where she is seen being arrested by the police for public nudity. Humiliated, Anne-Marie dumps the photographer but soon finds solace in enigmatic fellow partygoer Mark E. DeSade (Robert Tayman), who offers to take her to his isolated country estate to escape the scandal her now ex-boyfriend has caused her.

Unfortunately, Anne-Marie soon discovers that Mark is a procurer of young girls for 'moral correction' by his sadistic mother, ex-reform school matron Margaret (Barbara Markham). Years earlier, Margaret was brought to trial when her corrupt reign over a girl's reform school led to the suicide of a young French girl under her charge (although in truth, Margaret murdered the girl and made it look like a suicide). Found not guilty but dismissed from her job in disgrace, she seduced the High Court Judge who heard her case (Patrick Barr). The judge, critical of the 'permissive society' of the England of the 1960s and 70s, nevertheless left his wife for Margaret, who bore him a son (Mark) who worked with her to turn their mansion home into a secret illegal prison for 'morally corrupt' and 'delinquent' young women, complete with a group of tough female wardens (led by Pete Walker regular Sheila Keith) who administer a harsh regime of corporal punishment upon their prisoners. However Mark and the now retired, blind and senile judge are oblivious to the fact that Margaret is in fact using the prison to torture and ultimately execute these young women upon them gaining three 'demerits' during their incarceration.

Anne-Marie soon falls foul of Margaret's cruelty as she reminds the evil matron of the charge she killed and whose death cost her her career and reputation. Meanwhile, Anne-Marie's concerned flatmate Julia (Ann Michelle) and Julia's boyfriend Tony (Ray Brooks) track down Mark, who has now discovered the full extent of his mother's murderous deeds at the prison after seeing her minions dispose of a prisoner's corpse.

Anne-Marie makes multiple escape attempts, but is recaptured every time. Her friends eventually find the prison, but too late to save her. She has been hanged after earning a third 'demerit'. As the police arrive Mark confronts his mother and is killed by her. Margaret, knowing the game is up, then kills herself with the same noose she set up for Anne-Marie. The judge and his wife's henchwomen are arrested, and the surviving prisoners are freed.

Cast
Barbara Markham as Margaret Wakehurst 
Patrick Barr as Justice Bailey  
Ray Brooks as Tony   
Ann Michelle as Julia
Sheila Keith as Walker
Dorothy Gordon as Bates
Penny Irving as Ann-Marie Di Verney
Robert Tayman as Mark E. Desade
Ivor Salter as Jack
Karan David as Karen
Celia Quicke as Denise
Ron Smerczak as Ted
Tony Sympson as Henry
Judy Robinson as Claire
Jane Hayward as Estelle
Celia Imrie as Barbara
Barry Martin as Al
Rose Hill as Henry's Wife
Dave Butler as Ticket Collector
David McGillivray as Cavan (uncredited)
Denis Tinsley as Police Sergeant (uncredited)
Pete Walker as Cyclist (uncredited)

Production
The film was Walker's first collaboration with screenwriter David McGillivray, who went on to write a further three films for him. It also marked the horror film debut of actress Sheila Keith, who went on to star in four more films for Walker. "House of Whipcord" opens with the ironic credit: "This film is dedicated to those who are disturbed by today's lax moral codes and who eagerly await the return of corporal and capital punishment".

Filming locations
The film was shot on location in London and the Forest of Dean, Gloucestershire, England. The prison in the film was Littledean Jail, Littledean, Gloucestershire.

Music
The film's music was composed and conducted by Stanley Myers who went on to compose four more films for Walker.

Release

Critical response

Allmovie called it a "disturbingly effective horror film", writing that "Many viewers will be offended by the film's repressive right-wing tone, but its genuine scares and creepy atmosphere will outweigh its philosophical offenses for most horror fans."

Halliwell's Film Guide described the film as a "low budget psychological horror that stylishly achieves its object: to disturb", and quotes Derek Elley in Films and Filming: "Shows that something worthwhile in the entertainment-horror market can be done for the tiny sum of £60,000".

David Pirie wrote in Time Out: "An above average sexploitation/horror that has been put together with some polish and care from a fairly original script. The film is dedicated ironically to all those who wish to see the return of capital punishment in Britain, and it's about a senile old judge and his wife who are so appalled by current permissiveness that they set up a gruesome house of correction for young girls. The only trouble is that the film undercuts its potentially interesting Gothic theme by some leering emphases, and the final result is likely to be seen and appreciated only by the people who will take the dedication at its face value."

Home media

References

External links
 
 
 
 
 

British independent films
1974 films
1974 horror films
1970s exploitation films
Films directed by Pete Walker
Films scored by Stanley Myers
Films set in country houses
1974 independent films
British horror films
American International Pictures films
British psychological horror films
Torture in films
1970s English-language films
1970s British films